Njivice (Serbian Cyrillic: Њивице) is a village in the Herceg Novi Municipality in Montenegro. Located at the entrance into Boka Kotorska, it provides a view of the town of Herceg Novi and Mount Orjen. It is part of an area known as Provodina.

Owing to its microclimate, Njivice abounds in diverse, exotic vegetation. Fruits like Japanese medlar, jujube, kiwi, banana or service tree make this town a "natural beauty".

Although geographically slightly isolated, Njivice has organized bus transport to Herceg Novi over the course of the entire calendar year. During the tourist season in the summer months, there are numerous boating companies that offer transportation to various tourist attractions on the nearby Luštica peninsula. These include Dobreč beach, Mamula islet, Žanjice beach, the Plava Špilja cave, and the village of Rose.

Populated places in Bay of Kotor
Populated places in Herceg Novi Municipality
Coastal towns in Montenegro
Serb communities in Montenegro